United States v. Ramsey may refer to the following legal cases:

United States v. Ramsey (1926), 271 U.S. 467 (1926), on federal jurisdiction in Indian tribal lands
United States v. Ramsey (1977), 431 U.S. 606 (1977), on the border search exception to the Fourth Amendment